There are 27 scheduled monuments in Maidstone, Kent, England. In the United Kingdom, a scheduled monument is an archaeological site or historic building of "national importance" that has been given protection against unauthorised change by being placed on a list (or "schedule") by the Secretary of State for Digital, Culture, Media and Sport; Historic England takes the leading role in identifying such sites. Scheduled monuments are defined in the Ancient Monuments and Archaeological Areas Act 1979 and the National Heritage Act 1983. They are also referred to as scheduled ancient monuments. There are about 20,000 scheduled monument entries on the list and more than one site can be included in a single entry. While a scheduled monument can also be recognised as a listed building, Historic England considers listed building status as a better way of protecting buildings than scheduled monument status. If a monument is considered by Historic England to "no longer merit scheduling" it can be removed from the schedule.

The borough of Maidstone is a local government district in the English county of Kent. The district had a population of approximately 166,400 in 2016. The monuments range in date from a neolithic standing stone to a tiny 18th-century mortuary, but the majority are medieval.

Although mostly reduced to ruins and earthworks, the district contains the remains of four castles and five moated manor houses that are scheduled monuments. A number of monuments are buildings of ecclesiastical origin including an abbey, a priory and two tithe barns. The buildings associated with the former College of All Saints and the Archbishop's Palace in Maidstone town centre form the best preserved group of scheduled monuments. Seven medieval bridges over the River Medway and its tributaries are also included.

Monuments

See also
 Grade I listed buildings in Maidstone
 Grade II* listed buildings in Maidstone

Notes

References

 
 
Maidstone scheduled monuments
Borough of Maidstone